Ihor Olehovych Stakhiv (born 30 July 1999 in Lviv, Ukraine) is a Ukrainian luger.

Career
Stakhiv started his sporting career as a singles rider. At the 2016 Winter Youth Olympics in Lillehammer, Norway, he finished 13th in the boys' singles competition. He was also 7th in team relay (together with Smaha, Lysetskyy, and Levkovych).

Stakhiv's first World Cup season was the 2016-17 season when he competed in Pyeongchang, South Korea. He finished 33rd in his first and only singles race at the World Cup.

Later, he switched to doubles and was teamed with Andrii Lysetskyi. Their first World Cup race was during the 2018-19 season in Igls, Austria, where they finished 20th. As of February 2022, Stakhiv's best World Cup finish was 10th in the 2019-20 season in Winterberg, Germany.

In 2022, Ihor Stakhiv was nominated for his first Winter Games in Beijing.

Personal life
Dukach studied physical culture and sports at the Lviv State University of Physical Culture.

Career results

Winter Olympics

World Championships

European Championships

Luge World Cup

Rankings

References

External links
 
 
 

1999 births
Living people
Sportspeople from Lviv
Ukrainian male lugers
Olympic lugers of Ukraine
Lugers at the 2016 Winter Youth Olympics
Lugers at the 2022 Winter Olympics